Lubaynah was a companion of the Islamic prophet Muhammad. She was one of the slaves freed by Abu Bakr.

She was in the possession of the Muammil branch of the Adi clan of the Quraysh. Zaneerah was her companion in slavery. They were both among the early converts to Islam in Mecca.

In 614 the Quraysh began a deliberate strategy of persecuting the Muslims of the lower classes in an attempt to make them abandon their faith. Umar was the member of the Adi clan who tortured Lubaynah.
One day Abu Bakr passed by while Umar was in the act of punishing Lubaynah. He beat her until he was tired, then he said: "I have only stopped beating you because I'm tired." She replied, "May Allah do the same to you!"

Abu Bakr then stepped in, bought Lubaynah from Umar and manumitted her.

References

See also
List of non-Arab Sahaba
Sunni view of the Sahaba

Women companions of the Prophet
Arabian slaves and freedmen
Non-Arab companions of the Prophet